Bracco is an Italian surname. Notable people with the surname include:

 C. A. Bracco (died 1905), Italian mandolinist, violinist and conductor
 Elizabeth Bracco (born 1957), American actress 
 Giovanni Bracco (1908–1968), Italian racing car driver
 Giovanni Vincenzo Bracco (1835–1889), Latin Patriarch of Jerusalem
 Jeremy Bracco (born 1997), American ice hockey player
 Lorraine Bracco (born 1954), American actress
 Lucas Bracco (born 1996), Argentine footballer 
 Roberto Bracco (1861–1943), Italian playwright and screenwriter
 Blessed Teresa Bracco (1924–1944), Italian Roman Catholic, killed during World War II after refusing to submit to the sexual aggression of a Nazi soldier

Bracco may also refer to: 
 Bracco Italiano, a breed of dog
 Bracco (company), international Group active in the healthcare sector headquartered in Milan

Italian-language surnames